Glyphipterix leucophragma is a moth in the family Glyphipterigidae. It is known from Angola.

References

Endemic fauna of Angola
Glyphipterigidae
Insects of Angola
Moths of Africa
Moths described in 1923